N. P. Chellappan Nair (1903 - 1972) was a playwright and short story writer from Kerala, India. He concentrated on social comedy of manners. Of his 200 stories, thirty-one have been published in a separate volume. He received the Kerala Sahitya Akademi Award for Drama in 1961 for the play Iblisukalude Naattil.

N. P. Chaellappan Nair was born in 1903 in Mannar, a small town in what is now Alappuzha district of Indian state of Kerala. He died in 1972 at the age of 69.

Works

Plays

 Pranaya Jambavan (1938)
 Lady Doctor (1940)
 Minnal Pranayam (1941)
 Vanakumari (1942)
 Lieutenant Nani  (1946)
 Iblisukalude Naattil (I960)
 Ksheerabala (1966)
 Itiyum Minnalum
 Vikata Yogi
 Bhavana
 Nurse
 Minnal Pinarukal
 Aa Prakasham Poliyukayilla
 Vazhivilakkukal
 Devadasi
 N. G. O.
 Gangayum Yamunayum Onnuchernnozhukanam
 Mohangal, Mohabhangangal
 Kakkakalum Kakkathamoburattikalum

Short stories

 NPyude Charithrakathakal (Collection of 21 short stories)
 Ere Nerum Kure Nunayum
 Dasapushpangal

Films
N. P. Chellappan Nair wrote the screenplay and starred in K. Subrahmaniam's film Prahlada (1941). He also scripted the films, Chandrika (1950), Sasidharan (1950), Chechi (1951) and Athmasanthi (1964).

References

External links 
 

1903 births
1972 deaths
20th-century Indian dramatists and playwrights
Indian male dramatists and playwrights
People from Alappuzha district
Dramatists and playwrights from Kerala
Malayalam-language writers
Malayalam-language dramatists and playwrights
Malayalam short story writers
Recipients of the Kerala Sahitya Akademi Award
20th-century Indian short story writers
Indian male short story writers
20th-century Indian male writers